Season 1984–85 was the 101st football season in which Dumbarton competed at a Scottish national level, entering the Scottish Football League for the 79th time, the Scottish Cup for the 90th time and the Scottish League Cup for the 38th time.

Overview 
Dumbarton's return to the top tier of Scottish league football for the first time in a decade was to be short-lived. At the end of the year, it was looking likely that survival might be achieved, being 6 points clear of the relegation zone, however with only a win and a draw being taken from the last 15 matches, Dumbarton finished in 9th place and relegated to the First Division for next season.

In the Scottish Cup, Dumbarton lost to First Division Motherwell in the third round - the team who would replace them in the Premier Division at the end of the season.

The League Cup format reverted to straight knock-out, and after a first round win over Queen of the South, Dumbarton lost to fellow Premier Division opponents Dundee United.

Locally, in the Stirlingshire Cup, after a win on penalties over Falkirk in the first round, a reversal of rolls was the case in the semi final in a disappointing 'penalties' semi final defeat to East Stirling.

Finally, Premier Division status brought with it an added bonus - being a participant in the annual televised indoor Tennent's Sixes tournament. Unfortunately Dumbarton did not progress beyond the group stages.

Results & fixtures

Scottish Premier Division

Scottish Cup

Scottish League Cup

Stirlingshire Cup

Pre-season and other matches

League table

Player statistics

Squad 

|}

Transfers

Players in

Players out

Reserve team
Dumbarton competed in the Scottish Premier Reserve League, winning 4 and drawing 5 of 36 matches finishing 10th of 10.

In the Reserve League Cup Dumbarton lost in the second round to Aberdeen and in the Second XI Cup lost out to Motherwell in the first round.

Trivia
 The League Cup match against Queen of the South on 22 August marked Martin McGowan's 100th appearance for Dumbarton in all national competitions - the 89th Dumbarton player to reach this milestone.
 The League Cup match against Queen of the South on 22 August also marked John Bourke's 200th appearance for Dumbarton in all national competitions - the 18th Dumbarton player to break the 'double century'.
 The League match against Aberdeen on 22 September marked Joe Coyle's 200th appearance for Dumbarton in all national competitions - the 19th Dumbarton player to break the 'double century'.
 The League match against Rangers on 20 October marked Albert Craig's 100th appearance for Dumbarton in all national competitions - the 90th Dumbarton player to reach this milestone.

See also
 1984–85 in Scottish football

References

External links
Scottish Football Historical Archive

Dumbarton F.C. seasons
Scottish football clubs 1984–85 season